Paratomoxia is a genus of beetles in the family Mordellidae, containing the following species:

Subgenus Metatomoxia Chûjô, 1957
Paratomoxia crux (Kônô, 1928)
Paratomoxia nipponica (Kônô, 1928)
Paratomoxia scutellata (Kônô, 1928)
Subgenus Paratomoxia Ermisch, 1950
Paratomoxia agathae Batten, 1990
Paratomoxia auroscutellata Ermisch, 1950
Paratomoxia biplagiata (Ermisch, 1949)
Paratomoxia hieroglyphica Ermisch, 1952
Paratomoxia maynei (Pic, 1931)
Paratomoxia pulchella (Ermisch, 1949)
Paratomoxia straeleni Ermisch, 1950
Paratomoxia testaceiventris (Pic, 1931)

References

Mordellidae